Skyler Howard (born November 6, 1994) is an American football quarterback that most recently played for the Obic Seagulls of the Japanese X-League.

High School & College
Howard was born in Fort Worth, Texas and attended Brewer High School. Howard originally signed to play as a walk on for  Stephen F. Austin State University, before opting to transfer to Riverside City College. Howard passed for over 3,000 yards and 33 touchdowns while playing for Riverside City College.

Howard transferred to WVU and joined the Mountaineers as a sophomore in 2014, playing only four games that season.

The following year, Howard started for the Mountaineers, playing in 13 games. He helped lead his team to victory over Arizona State in the 2016 Cactus Bowl.

College statistics

Professional career

Seattle Seahawks
Howard signed with the Seattle Seahawks as an undrafted free agent on May 12, 2017. He was waived by the Seahawks on June 15, 2017.

Toronto Argonauts
On September 20, 2017, Howard was signed to the practice roster of the Toronto Argonauts of the Canadian Football League. He was released from their practice roster on October 3, 2017.

Obic Seagulls

2018
Howard began playing overseas for the X-League of Japan. Howard started his first game completing 7 of 12 for 134 yards and 3 touchdowns , rushing 69 yards and 1 touchdown, leading the team to rout the Meijiyasuda PentaOcean Pirates 59–0 on Thursday, May 3, 2018, in the preliminary round of the Pearl Bowl preseason tournament at Fujitsu Stadium Kawasaki.

During the second round, Howard completed 12 out of 20 passes including 2 touchdowns and rushed 36 yards that helped secure a 21–6 victory over the Fujitsu Frontiers to clinch a place in the semifinals of the Pearl Bowl tournament.

Despite wet and sloppy playing conditions, Howard was leading the Obic Seagulls to a 23–10 win over the Lixil Deers. The Obic Seagulls advanced to the championship game against the IBM BigBlue on June 28 in the Tokyo Dome.

In the Pearl Bowl final, Howard completed 7 out of 14  passes for 102 yards with 1 touchdown, and rushed 63 yards. The Obic Seagulls won the IBM BigBlue 28–2. For his efforts, he was awarded the Pearl Bowl MVP.

Statistics

Pre season

Regular  season

References

External links
Obic Seagulls bio (Japanese)
West Virginia Mountaineers bio
Riverside City College Tigers bio

1994 births
Living people
Riverside City Tigers football players
West Virginia Mountaineers football players
Sportspeople from Fort Worth, Texas
American football quarterbacks
Seattle Seahawks players
Toronto Argonauts players
Canadian football quarterbacks
American players of Canadian football
American expatriate sportspeople in Japan
American expatriate players of American football